Gamaksan is a South Korean mountain that extends across the city of Wonju, Gangwon-do, and Jecheon, Chungcheongbuk-do.

See also
 List of mountains in Korea

Notes

References
 

Mountains of Gangwon Province, South Korea
Wonju
Jecheon
Mountains of North Chungcheong Province
Mountains of South Korea